California Youth Symphony (CYS) is a San Francisco Bay Area symphony orchestra for young musicians of high school age and younger. It was founded in 1952 by Aaron Sten and in 1963 became the first United States youth orchestra to tour abroad, performing twelve concerts in Japan, including a joint concert with Tokyo Junior Orchestra Society. Since then, the orchestra has toured Mexico, Australia, Uruguay, Argentina and several countries in Europe and Asia. In 1994, the orchestra placed first in the International Youth and Music Festival Competition in Vienna. The orchestra has also collaborated with youth orchestras in Japan and in Switzerland. During the summer of 2014, the orchestra is touring in Eastern Europe, and will perform in Slovakia, Slovenia, Croatia, and the Czech Republic.  Leo Eylar has been musical director since 1990.

History and tours
The California Youth Symphony, or CYS for short, is one of the first youth symphony orchestras established in California and comprises some of the state's most musically talented youth. It was founded in 1952, and since 1963 has toured several countries around the globe, a semi-annual tradition, and most recently completed a tour to Japan with performances of Gershwin's An American in Paris, Rimsky-Korsakov's Scheherazade, and Rachmaninov's Rhapsody on a Theme by Paganini.

Repertoire
CYS is notable for its challenging repertoire that includes works by Igor Stravinsky, Béla Bartók, Dmitri Shostakovich, Aaron Copland, George Gershwin, Leonard Bernstein, Sergei Prokofiev, Richard Strauss, Gustav Mahler, and many others. CYS has also premiered many modern works, including music director Leo Eylar's Rhapsody for Orchestra, a piece nominated for the Pulitzer Prize, and the West Coast premiere of pieces such as Resurrexit by Mason Bates.

CYS has also recorded a number of CDs, the most recent one recorded during the 2010–2011 season. More information regarding CYS recordings is available on the California Youth Symphony website, listed below. Sound samples are also available on the same page.

Ensembles
The CYS comprises several ensembles. In addition to the CYS Orchestra, the senior/advanced level, there is an advanced/intermediate level CYS Associate Orchestra, Wind Symphony, Percussion Ensemble, Flute Ensemble and Preparatory Ensembles for strings and winds. Overall, CYS musicians number over 500 from the greater San Francisco Bay Area, ranging from elementary school students to high school seniors. Composer-conductor Leo Eylar, former co-concertmaster of the San Jose Symphony conducts the Associate Orchestra and the Senior Orchestra, the CYS premier orchestra.

CYS Senior Orchestra
The CYS Orchestra is CYS' Senior/advanced level and is conducted by Leo Eylar.  It performs 7 concerts per year in the Bay Area. Players participate in weekly rehearsals during the school year, including special section-specific workshops by outside instructors.  Members attend a week of sleep-away summer camp in the redwoods. The CYS Senior Orchestra tours semiannually, in the summer. For the 2021-2022 year, the Senior Orchestra's Concertmaster has been Erica Liu, and the Associate Concertmaster has been Jenna Kang.

CYS Associate Orchestra
The Associate Orchestra is CYS' advanced/intermediate level symphony-orchestra and is conducted by Leo Eylar.  The Associate Orchestra plays medium-difficult repertoire, and has typical orchestration. The repertoire is varied and serves as a valuable introduction to the orchestral experience. The CYS Associate Orchestra performs 3 to 4 concerts per year. Members attend a summer day camp in August.

CYS Wind Symphony
The CYS Wind Symphony is conducted by Pete Nowlen and features woodwind, brass, and percussion players.

Wind Preparatory Ensembles
There are two Wind Preparatory (Wind Prep) Ensembles that function as large symphonic bands, and mainly comprise middle school students, along with some high school students. These Wind Prep Ensembles are under the direction of Rosita Amador. They are entitled "preparatory" because they serve to prepare the younger wind players for the CYS Wind Symphony. The orchestration is typical, including flutes, oboes, clarinets, saxophones, bassoons, trumpets, French horns, trombones, and (tubas) (in relatively accurate score order). The group performs two concerts a year.

CYS Junior and Intermediate Preparatory String Ensembles
With Junior and Intermediate levels, the CYS String Preparatory Program provides string music instruction and ensemble experiences for younger musicians to prepare them for the CYS Associate Orchestra. Under the direction of Kati Kyme, the CYS Intermediate String Ensemble performs 2 concerts per year.

Percussion Ensemble
Under the direction of Artie Storch, the CYS Percussion Ensemble is a unique forum for talented musicians through grade 12. Members of the Ensemble study an exciting repertoire and perform in the Ensemble's 2-3 CYS concerts each year and at other music events around the Bay Area. In addition, students learn about and improve their techniques on a variety of percussion instruments. Membership is open to both members of the CYS orchestras and to other musicians.

Auditions
Newcomers must audition to get in and those that are already in the symphony do not need to audition yearly to stay in. CYS members can be promoted to higher levels. The CYS levels of advancement might be portrayed as follows:

CYS Flute Ensemble/Wind Prep I/Beginning Strings –> CYS Flute Ensemble/Wind Prep II/Intermediate Strings –> Wind Symphony –> Associate Orchestra –> CYS Senior Orchestra

Non-Convergent (not part of the general promotion system): CYS Percussion Ensemble

CYS attracts some of the Bay Area's most talented young musicians, at all levels. It is a non-profit organization.

External links
 
 Young Artist Competition
 CYS Critique
 CYS Ensembles and other news

American youth orchestras
Musical groups established in 1952
1952 establishments in California
Youth organizations based in California
Orchestras based in California